Karl-Friedrich Scheufele (born 5 February 1958) is Co-President of Chopard along with his sister, Caroline, and President of La Chronométrie Ferdinand Berthoud. He is the son of Karl and Karin Scheufele, German entrepreneurs who acquired Chopard in 1963. In 2005, he established the Fleurier Quality Foundation, an independent Swiss watch certification body, and he founded the L.U.C.EUM watch museum in Fleurier a year later.

He set up a wine sales company, La Galerie des Arts du Vin, at the end of the 1990s and acquired a number of Caveaux de Bacchus boutiques in Switzerland. In 2012, he bought the Château Monestier-la-Tour wine estate, which produces 150,000 bottles per year in a variety of AOPs in France.

Early life 
Karl-Friedrich Scheufele was born in 1958 in Pforzheim and lived there until the age of 15. His parents were at the head of watchmaking company Eszeha, based in Pforzheim.

In 1963, his father, Karl, took over the Geneva-based watch manufacturer Chopard. Since that time, the family has split its time between Germany and Switzerland.

At the age of 15, Karl-Friedrich left Germany for Switzerland and enrolled in the International School of Geneva (Ecolint), along with his sister Caroline. In 1973, he served an apprenticeship with a jeweler in Geneva, before studying at the Faculty of Business and Economics (HEC Lausanne).

Directorship 
Karl-Friedrich Scheufele joined Chopard in the 1980s, spending successive periods in all departments. Caroline also went to work for the family business.

At the age of 22, he designed the company's first sports watch. The St. Moritz is also the first model conceived by Karl-Friedrich. From that time, Karl-Friedrich built the Chopard business around watch making. Later, he founded a manufacture exclusively dedicated to the production of high precision mechanical movements. Chopard Manufacture was inaugurated in 1996 in Fleurier in the Val-de-Travers.

In 2001, Karl-Friedrich and his sister became Co-Presidents of the company. Karl-Friedrich Scheufele and Michel Parmigiani jointly set up the Fleurier Quality Foundation, an independent watch certification body. The Fleurier Quality label, which particularly certifies 100% Swiss manufacture, was established in 2005. In 2006, Karl-Friedrich Scheufele inaugurated the L.U.CEUM watchmaking museum in Fleurier. Today, Karl-Friedrich is in charge of the Chopard Manufacture, the men's watches division and all business management aspects, including marketing, advertising and communication.

Revival of Ferdinand Berthoud 
While seeking to enrich the collection at the L.U.C.EUM watchmaking museum, Karl-Friedrich uncovered the history of watchmaker Ferdinand Berthoud (1727–1807). In 2006, Karl-Friedrich acquired the Ferdinand Berthoud brand. He registered the trade name under Chronométrie Ferdinand Berthoud in 2013 and launched it in 2015.

In 2016, Karl-Friedrich was awarded with the Aiguille d'Or prize ("Golden Hand"), the highest distinction awarded by the Grand Prix de l'Horlogerie in Geneva, for a Ferdinand Berthoud watch. In November 2017, he won the same prize for Chopard's L.U.C Full Strike watch.

Other interests

Winemaking 
As a wine lover, alongside his work for Chopard, Karl-Friedrich established a wine sales company, La Galerie des Arts du Vin, in 1996. Three years later, he acquired the Caveau de Bacchus boutique and opened several boutiques across Switzerland.

In 2012, Karl-Friedrich Scheufele acquired the Château Monestier-la-Tour in France, a wine estate in the region of Bergerac that comprises over 100 hectares, including 30 hectares of vineyards of the Bergerac AOC appellation. In 2017, after having completed the renovation of its buildings and the restructuring of the vineyard, the estate obtained organic certification. It now produces 150,000 bottles in AOP Bergerac, Côtes de Bergerac and AOP Saussignac.

Car racing 
Karl-Friedrich also collects vintage cars, a passion he shares with his father. In 1987, Karl-Friedrich discovered the Mille Miglia, a classic car rally that runs from Brescia to Rome. He completed this 1,600 km race with his father. The following year, he set up a partnership between Chopard and Mille Miglia, and the company became the official race sponsor. Since that time, he has taken part in each edition, often with racing driver Jacky Ickx. A few years later, he created further partnerships with the Grand Prix de Monaco Historique and with Porsche Motorsport.

References 

20th-century Swiss businesspeople
1958 births
Living people
Swiss watchmakers (people)
Swiss billionaires
21st-century Swiss businesspeople
20th-century German businesspeople
21st-century German businesspeople
German billionaires
German watchmakers (people)
Museum founders